Volunteer State may refer to:

Tennessee, whose state nickname is "the Volunteer State"
Volunteer State Community College, a community college in Gallatin, Tennessee

See also
 Tennessee Volunteers, the varsity intercollegiate athletics programs of the University of Tennessee